Yun Chol (born 1 January 1975,) is a North Korean short track speed skater. He competed in two events at the 1998 Winter Olympics.

References

External links
 

1975 births
Living people
North Korean male short track speed skaters
Olympic short track speed skaters of North Korea
Short track speed skaters at the 1998 Winter Olympics
Place of birth missing (living people)
20th-century North Korean people